Plamen Timchev (born 12 July 1951) is a Bulgarian former cyclist. He competed in the team pursuit event at the 1972 Summer Olympics.

References

External links
 

1951 births
Living people
Bulgarian male cyclists
Olympic cyclists of Bulgaria
Cyclists at the 1972 Summer Olympics
People from Gabrovo